The Field Elm cultivar Ulmus minor 'Amplifolia' was first described (as U. foliacaea var. amplifolia) in 1932, and sourced from Hesse's Nurseries, Weener, Germany as U. alba Waldst. et Kit.

Description
The tree was said to have very short internodes with crowded leaves.

Cultivation
No specimens are known to survive.

References

External links
 Formerly called U. campestris amplifolia, Den Haag, 1954 
 Formerly called U. campestris amplifolia, Den Haag, 1954
  Formerly called U. foliacea 'Amplifolia', Wageningen Arboretum, 1962

Field elm cultivar
Ulmus articles missing images
Ulmus
Missing elm cultivars